Thomas Gilbert Seymour (1906–1983) was an English footballer who played as a full-back for Oldham Athletic, as well as non league football for several other clubs. He ended his playing career at Shrewsbury Town, where he later became a trainer and physio,

 as well as running business as a publican in Shrewsbury.

References

English footballers
Crook Town A.F.C. players
Bury F.C. players
Swansea City A.F.C. players
Connah's Quay & Shotton F.C. players
Oldham Athletic A.F.C. players
Shrewsbury Town F.C. players
1906 births
1983 deaths